— closing lines of Rudyard Kipling's If—, first published this year

Nationality words link to articles with information on the nation's poetry or literature (for instance, Irish or France).

Events
 July 7 – Charles Thomas Wooldridge is hanged at Reading Gaol in England for uxoricide, inspiring fellow-prisoner C.3.3. Oscar Wilde's The Ballad of Reading Gaol (1897).
 William Morris publishes the Kelmscott Press edition of Chaucer's works

Works published in English

Australia
 John Le Gay Brereton:
 Perdita, A Sonnet Record
 The Song of Brotherhood and Other Verses
 Edward Dyson, Rhymes from the Mines and Other Lines
 Henry Lawson:
 In the Days When the World was Wide and Other Verses
 "The Teams"
 Banjo Paterson:
 The Man from Snowy River
 "Mulga Bill's Bicycle"

Canada
 Bliss Carman, with Richard Hovey, More Songs from Vagabondia, Canadian author published in the United States
 Charles G. D. Roberts, The Book of the Native
Charles Sangster, Our Norland. Toronto: Copp Clark, n.d.
 Duncan Campbell Scott, In the Village of Viger, Canada
 Francis Sherman
 In Memorabilia Mortis. Boston: Copeland and Day.
 Matins. Boston: Copeland and Day.

United Kingdom
To an Athlete Dying Youngby A. E. Housman
Smart lad, to slip betimes away
From fields where glory does not stay
And early though the laurel grows
It withers quicker than the rose.

Eyes the shady night has shut
Cannot see the record cut,
And silence sounds no worse than cheers  
After earth has stopped the ears:
-- Lines 9-16

 Hilaire Belloc:
 The Bad Child's Book of Beasts
 Verses and Sonnets
 Laurence Binyon, First Book of London Visions (see also Second Book of London Visions 1899)
 Mary Elizabeth Coleridge, publishing under the pen name "Anodos", Fancy's Following (see also Fancy's Guerdon 1897)
 Ernest Dowson, Verses, including "Non Sum Qualis Eram"
 A. E. Housman, A Shropshire Lad, including "To an Athlete Dying Young", "Loveliest of Trees, the Cherry Now" and "When I Was One-and-Twenty"
 Laurence Housman, Green Arras
 Rudyard Kipling, The Seven Seas
 Alice Meynell, Other Poems
 Henry Newbolt, "Drake's Drum", published in the St. John's Gazette (first published in book form in Admirals All, and Other Verses 1897)
 John Cowper Powys, Odes, and Other Poems
 Arthur Quiller-Couch, Poems and Ballads
 Christina Rossetti, New Poems, edited by W. M. Rossetti
 Robert Louis Stevenson, Songs of Travel, and Other Verses
 Algernon Charles Swinburne, The Tale of Balen
 William Watson, The Purple East

United States
 Thomas Bailey Aldrich:
 Judith and Holofernes
 Later Lyrics
 Bliss Carman, with Richard Hovey, More Songs from Vagabondia, Canadian author published in the United States
 Emily Dickinson, Poems: Third Series
 Paul Laurence Dunbar
 Lyrics of Lowly Life
 Majors and Minors
 "We Wear the Mask"
 Lizette Woodworth Reese, A Quiet Road
 Edwin Arlington Robinson, The Torrent and the Night Before

Works published in other languages
 Nérée Beauchemin, Les floraisons matutinales; the author's first published collection; French language; Trois-Rivières, Canada
 José Santos Chocano, Azahares, Peru
 Richard Dehmel, Weib und Welt ("Woman and World"), German
 Narasinghrao, Hridayaveena containing khandakavyas, garbis (religious, ethical and romantic lyrics), and poems about nature and women (Indian, writing in Gujarati)
 Tekkan Yosano, Tozai namboku ("East-west, north-south"), tanka poetry, Japan

Awards and honors
 Alfred Austin made Poet Laureate

Births
Death years link to the corresponding "[year] in poetry" article:
 January 26 – Walter D'Arcy Cresswell (died 1960), New Zealand
 February 26 – Andrei Zhdanov (died 1948), a Soviet official who persecuted poets, writers and artists under the Zhdanov doctrine
 May 9 – Austin Clarke (died 1974), Irish poet, playwright and judge
 August 27 – Kenji Miyazawa 宮沢 賢治 (died 1933), Japanese, early Shōwa period poet and author of children's literature (surname: Miyazawa)
 September 22 – Uri Zvi Grinberg (died 1981), Jewish
 October 12 – Eugenio Montale (died 1981), Italian
 October 30 – Kostas Karyotakis (died 1928), Greek
 December 1 – Teiko Tomita (died 1990), Japanese-born American poet who wrote in Japanese

Deaths
Birth years link to the corresponding "[year] in poetry" article:
 January 8 – Paul Verlaine (born 1844), French
 March 20 – Alexander McLachlan (born 1818), Scottish-born Canadian
 March 21 – Elizabeth Otis Dannelly (born 1838), American writer of Southern poetry
 May 11 – Henry Cuyler Bunner (born 1855), American novelist and poet
 October 3 – William Morris (born 1834), English poet, writer, designer and socialist
 October 29 – Thomas Edward Brown (born 1830), Manx poet writing in English
 November 26
 Mathilde Blind (born 1841), German-born British poet writing in English
 Coventry Patmore (born 1823), English

See also

 19th century in poetry
 19th century in literature
 List of years in poetry
 List of years in literature
 Victorian literature
 French literature of the 19th century
 Symbolist poetry
 Young Poland (Młoda Polska) a modernist period in Polish  arts and literature, roughly from 1890 to 1918
 Poetry

Notes

19th-century poetry
Poetry